William Worge Kreü (born May 15, 2000) is a Swedish professional ice hockey defenceman currently playing for IK Oskarshamn of the Swedish Hockey League (SHL). William was drafted in the seventh round, 187th overall, by the Buffalo Sabres in the 2018 NHL Entry Draft.

Worge Kreü made his SHL debut for Linköping HC during the 2017–18 SHL season.

References

External links

2000 births
Living people
Buffalo Sabres draft picks
Linköping HC players
IK Oskarshamn players
Sportspeople from Linköping
Swedish ice hockey defencemen
Sportspeople from Östergötland County
Väsby IK players